God and Country may refer to:
 God and Country program, former name for the PRAY Program of the Boy Scouts of America
 "God and Country" (Touched by an Angel) episode of season 4 of the series

For God and Country may refer to:
For God and Country (James Yee), a 2005 nonfiction book
For God & Country (Daniel Reyes), a 2009 novel
For God and Country (Dolly Parton album)
For God and Country (Good Riddance album)
"For God and Country" (Homicide: Life on the Street), an episode of Homicide: Life on the Street
For God and Country (Jan Howard album)
"For God and Country", a song by the Smashing Pumpkins from Zeitgeist
Pro Deo et patria, a Latin motto meaning "for God and country"
For God and Country, the original title for the 2012 movie Zero Dark Thirty
For God and Country, the original title for the 2017 television series The Brave

See also
 For king and country (disambiguation)
 God's Country (disambiguation)